The Melbourne Bowl  is a proposed NCAA Division I Football Bowl Subdivision college football bowl game to be played in Melbourne, Australia at Marvel Stadium. The college conferences that would have tie-ins with the bowl are the Pac-12 Conference and the Mountain West Conference.  It would be the third FBS bowl game played outside the United States after the defunct International Bowl and present-day Bahamas Bowl.

History
In 2015, Australian officials met with officials of the Pac-12 Conference and the Mountain West Conference to bring a FBS bowl game to Australia.  The bowl game would start for the 2016 College Football season.  On April 11, 2016, the NCAA announced a freeze on new bowl games until after the 2019 season.

References

College football bowls
Annual sporting events in the United States
American football in Australia
Sports competitions in Melbourne